George Washington Gale Ferris Jr. (February 14, 1859 – November 22, 1896) was an American civil engineer. He is mostly known for creating the original Ferris Wheel for the 1893 Chicago World's Columbian Exposition.

Early life 
Ferris was born on February 14, 1859, in Galesburg, Illinois, the town founded by his namesake, George Washington Gale. His parents were George Washington Gale Ferris Sr. and Martha Edgerton Hyde. He had an older brother named Frederick Hyde, born in 1843. In 1864, five years after Ferris was born, his family sold their dairy farm and moved to Nevada. For two years, they lived in Carson Valley.

From 1868 to 1890, his father, George Washington Gale Ferris Sr., owned the Sears–Ferris House, at 311 W. Third, Carson City, Nevada. Originally built in about 1863 by Gregory A. Sears, a pioneer Carson City businessman, the house was added to the National Register of Historic Places for Carson City on February 9, 1979. 

Ferris Senior was an agriculturalist/horticulturalist, noteworthy in Carson City's development for much of the city's landscaping during the 1870s, and for importing a large number of the trees from the east that were planted throughout the city.

Ferris left Nevada in 1875 to attend the California Military Academy in Oakland, where he graduated in 1876. He graduated from Rensselaer Polytechnic Institute in Troy, New York, in the class of 1881 with a degree in Civil Engineering. At RPI he was a charter member of the local chapter of the Chi Phi Fraternity and a member of the Rensselaer Society of Engineers.  He was made a member of the Rensselaer Polytechnic Institute Alumni Hall of Fame in 1998.

Ferris began his career in the railroad industry and was interested in bridge building.  He founded a company, G.W.G. Ferris & Co. in Pittsburgh, Pennsylvania, to test and inspect metals for railroads and bridge builders.

Ferris House, his home at 1318 Arch Street, Central Northside, was added to the list of City of Pittsburgh Designated Historic Structures on June 28, 2001.

Ferris wheel

News of the World's Columbian Exposition to be held in 1893, in Chicago, Illinois, drew Ferris to the city. In 1891, the directors of the World's Columbian Exposition issued a challenge to American engineers to conceive of a monument for the fair that would surpass the Eiffel Tower, the great structure of the Paris International Exposition of 1889. The planners wanted something "original, daring and unique". Ferris responded with a proposed wheel from which visitors would be able to view the entire exhibition, a wheel that would "Out-Eiffel Eiffel". The planners feared his design for a rotating wheel towering over the grounds could not possibly be safe.

Ferris persisted.  He returned in a few weeks with several respectable endorsements from established engineers, and the committee agreed to allow construction to begin. Most convincingly, he had recruited several local investors to cover the $400,000 cost of construction. The planning commission of the Exposition hoped that admissions from the Ferris Wheel would pull the fair out of debt and eventually make it profitable.

The Ferris Wheel had 36 cars, each fitted with 40 revolving chairs and able to accommodate up to 60 people, giving a total capacity of 2,160. When the fair opened, it carried some 38,000 passengers daily, taking 20 minutes to complete two revolutions, the first involving six stops to allow passengers to exit and enter and the second a nine-minute non-stop rotation, for which the ticket holder paid 50 cents. It carried 2.5 million passengers before it was finally demolished in 1906.

After the fair closed, Ferris claimed that the exhibition management had robbed him and his investors of their portion of the nearly $750,000 profit that his wheel brought in. He spent the next two years in litigation.

Death
Ferris Sr. died in 1895, followed soon after by Ferris Jr. himself, on November 22, 1896, at Mercy Hospital in Pittsburgh, Pennsylvania, of typhoid fever. His ashes remained at a Pittsburgh crematorium for over a year, waiting for someone to take possession of them.

See also 

Ferris wheel

References

Further reading
 Weingardt, Richard G. Circles in the Sky: The Life and Times of George Ferris. Reston, Va.: American Society of Civil Engineers, 2009.
 Larson, Erik  Devil in the White City: Murder, Magic, and Madness at the Fair that Changed America. Crown Publishers, 2003

External links
 Massachusetts Institute of Technology: Historical Inventors – George Ferris – The Ferris Wheel
 Rensselaer Polytechnic Institute:  Alumni Hall of Fame – George W.G. Ferris

1859 births
1896 deaths
19th-century American engineers
19th-century American inventors
American civil engineers
Amusement ride manufacturers

Deaths from typhoid fever
Infectious disease deaths in Pennsylvania
People from Galesburg, Illinois
Rensselaer Polytechnic Institute alumni
Nevada State Register of Historic Places
World's Columbian Exposition
Engineers from Illinois
Inventors from Illinois